Crataegus microphylla is a species of hawthorn found in the former Yugoslavia, Bulgaria, Ukraine, Crimea, European Russia, the Transcaucasus, Anatolia, Iraq and Iran. Typically a slender shrub, it is occasionally grown as an ornamental.

References

microphylla
Plants described in 1853